The Kootenai Lodge Historic District is a site on the National Register of Historic Places located in Bigfork, Montana.  It was added to the Register on January 17, 1984. The listing has 25 contributing buildings.

Architects Cutter and Malmgran are believed to have designed cabins #1, #2, #3, #5, #6, and #7, which were built by local craftsmen Ward Whitney
and Fred Kitzmiller.  William Moose was stonemason.

The 1922 barn was built by local builder Les Averil.

References

Hotel buildings on the National Register of Historic Places in Montana
1908 establishments in Montana
Historic districts on the National Register of Historic Places in Montana
National Register of Historic Places in Lake County, Montana